Spdf or SPDF may refer to:

Electron configuration, for which there is an obsolete system of categorizing spectral lines as "sharp", "principal", "diffuse" and "fundamental"; also the names of the sub shells or orbitals
The blocks of the periodic table
Seychelles People's Defence Force, the military of Seychelles
Sudan People's Defense Forces/Democratic Front, a militia in South Sudan